The 1974–75 Australian region cyclone season was an above average tropical cyclone season.

Systems

Tropical Cyclone Marcia

The first named storm of the season developed as a small depression out over the open waters of the southern Indian Ocean. Over the following three days, the system gradually developed into a tropical cyclone as it tracked towards the southeast. On 18 October, a ship named Alkuwait encountered the storm and reported winds near hurricane-force; however, the satellite presentation of the system was not supportive of these winds. Later named Marcia, the storm is estimated to have attained peak winds around 85 km/h (50 mph) on 20 October. Around this time Marcia also attained a barometric pressure of 989 mbar (hPa; 29.2 inHg). On 22 October, the storm slowed and began tracking towards the west. A weakened system, the remnants of Marcia crossed 90°E into the South-West Indian Ocean basin.

Tropical Cyclone Norah

Cyclone Norah existed over the eastern Indian Ocean from October 28 to November 4.

Tropical Cyclone Penny

Cyclone Penny also existed over the eastern Indian Ocean from November 6 to November 16.

Severe Tropical Cyclone Selma

Cyclone Selma was predicted to impact Darwin, but instead, the system turned westward out to sea and eventually dissipated over open water.

Severe Tropical Cyclone Tracy

Cyclone Tracy devastated the city of Darwin, Northern Territory, Australia, from Christmas Eve to Christmas Day, 1974. It is the most compact cyclone or equivalent-strength hurricane on record in the Australian basin, with gale-force winds extending only  from the centre and was the most compact system worldwide until Tropical Storm Marco of the 2008 Atlantic hurricane season broke the record, with gale-force winds extending only  from the centre. After forming over the Arafura Sea, the storm moved southwards and affected the city with Category 4 winds on the Australian cyclone intensity scale, while there is evidence to suggest that it had reached Category 3 on the Saffir-Simpson Hurricane Scale when it made landfall.

Tracy killed 71 people, caused 837 million in damage (1974 dollars) and destroyed more than 70 percent of Darwin's buildings, including 80 percent of houses. Tracy left more than 41,000 out of the 47,000 inhabitants of the city homeless prior to landfall and required the evacuation of over 30,000 people.  Most of Darwin's population was evacuated to Adelaide, Whyalla, Alice Springs and Sydney, and many never returned to the city. After the storm passed, the city was rebuilt using more modern materials and updated building techniques. Bruce Stannard of The Age stated that Cyclone Tracy was a "disaster of the first magnitude ... without parallel in Australia's history."

Tropical Cyclone Flora

Tropical Cyclone Flora existed from January 12 to January 22.

Tropical Cyclone Robyn–Deborah

Tropical Cyclone Robyn–Deborah existed from January 14 to January 16, when it moved into the South-West Indian Ocean.

Tropical Cyclone Gloria

Tropical Cyclone Gloria existed from January 14 to January 23.

Tropical Cyclone Shirley

Tropical Cyclone Shirley existed from February 3 to February 12.

Severe Tropical Cyclone Trixie

The Onslow anemometer was destroyed after measuring its maximum gust during this storm. The gust at Mardie is the second-highest recorded on the Australian mainland, although the figure given was the limit of the anemometer, so the actual gusts may have been higher.

Tropical Cyclone Wilma

Tropical Cyclone Wilma existed from March 10 to March 14.

Tropical Cyclone Vida

On 20 March 1975 winds were recorded to 128 km/h at Fremantle, Western Australia and 109 km/h in neighbouring Perth. There was some damage including St George's Cathedral and Perry Lakes Stadium. At Rockingham a 7m-yacht sank, a 6m cabin cruiser was destroyed and many other craft were damaged. Some homes lost their roofs and a few buildings had their walls collapse. Offshore, several vessels were damaged by rough seas. Relatively little rain was associated with the storm as only  was measured in Cape Leeuwin. Overall losses from the storm reached A$1 million ($700,000 USD).

Severe Tropical Cyclone Beverley

Tropical cyclone Beverley affected Exmouth, Western Australia and the west coast in March 1975.

Tropical Cyclone Amelia

Cyclone Amelia existed from April 6 to April 8.

Tropical Cyclone Clara

Cyclone Clara existed from April 20 to April 26.

Tropical Cyclone Denise

Cyclone Denise existed from May 18 to May 25.

Other systems
Over the next couple of days, the system moved north-westwards into the South Pacific basin towards New Caledonia, before it recurved south-eastwards and was last noted during 25 November after it had moved back into the Australian region.

See also

Atlantic hurricane seasons: 1974, 1975
Eastern Pacific hurricane seasons: 1974, 1975
Western Pacific typhoon seasons: 1974, 1975
North Indian Ocean cyclone seasons: 1974, 1975

References

 
Australian region cyclone seasons
Aust
 disasters in Australia
 disasters in Australia
 disasters in Oceania
 disasters in Oceania